Arina Hugenholtz (20 September 1848 – 4 April 1934) was a Dutch  painter. She is known for her landscape and genre paintings.

Biography
Hugenholtz was born 20 September 1848 in Cillaarshoek. She attended Royal Academy of Art at The Hague and the State Academy of Fine Arts in Amsterdam. She studied with Anton Mauve.

Hugenholtz exhibited her work at the Palace of Fine Arts at the 1893 World's Columbian Exposition in Chicago, Illinois.

In 1894 she settled in Laren, where she had a studio built and she was associated with the Laren School

Hugenholtz died 4 April 1934 in Laren.

Her works are in the Singer Museum in Laren and the Frans Hals Museum in Haarlem.

Gallery

References

External links
 

1848 births
1934 deaths
Dutch women painters
19th-century Dutch women artists
20th-century Dutch women artists
19th-century Dutch painters
20th-century Dutch painters